The Kress Events Center, also known as the KEC or the Kress, is a multipurpose athletic facility located in Green Bay, Wisconsin on the University of Wisconsin–Green Bay campus. The facility's main gym (Kress Events Center Arena) hosts the UW-Green Bay women's basketball and volleyball teams. Other facilities onsite include a fitness center shared by athletes and the student body, athletic training facilities, and the administrative offices of UW-Green Bay's athletics program.

History 
UW-Green Bay sought funding to renovate its aging athletic facility, the Phoenix Sports Center (built in 1975), as early as 2003. The school received $7.5 million in funding from the state, and expected an equal amount of private donations to fund the renovation. The remainder of the money was to be raised through an increase in student segregated fees, which pay for student life and other recreational activities. As of 2017, students were still paying off the facility through their segregated fees. After receiving a large donation from the George F. Kress Foundation, the school was able to begin construction, the new facility bearing Kress' name. Officially announced on December 29, 2004, construction began November 2, 2005 and the facility opened two years later that same month. The first event hosted in the new building was a volleyball match against UW-Milwaukee. UW-Green Bay holds its spring graduation ceremony at the Kress Events Center, and three out of the four area high schools (Green Bay East, West and Southwest) hold their graduation ceremonies at the KEC. In 2007, the KEC hosted a joint concert featuring Christian rock groups Switchfoot and Relient K. UW-Green Bay's student programming group had booked pop singer Kesha for a concert at the KEC in spring 2014, but the event was ultimately cancelled. The KEC has also played host to political rallies during campaign seasons, including Barack Obama in 2008 and Bernie Sanders in 2016.

Facilities

Phoenix Sports Center 
The KEC was built around the existing Phoenix Sports Center and retains a number of its original facilities, including:
 Two full-size gyms (old East and West Gyms), typically used for intramural basketball or volleyball
 Some older athletic training facilities, and the swimming, softball, and nordic skiing team rooms
 The Peter F. Dorschel Natorium, a swimming and diving facility
 Racquetball courts

Facilities added with KEC expansion 
 Kress Events Center Arena, a 4,018-seat gym and the facility's main event venue
 Men's and women's soccer team rooms, basketball team rooms
 Dick Bennett Gym, named for the coach who brought success to UW-Green Bay's basketball team in the 1990s. Mainly used as a practice gym for the basketball teams, the gym is open to students when not in use by athletics.
 A two-level fitness center used by both athletes and students
 An indoor turf gym
 A studio used for fitness classes
 Administrative offices for UW-Green Bay Athletics

See also
 List of NCAA Division I basketball arenas

References

External links
Venue information
Photos of venue

College basketball venues in the United States
Basketball venues in Wisconsin
Green Bay Phoenix basketball venues